INPACT Global is an international group of accounting firms that provide audit, accountancy, tax, business restructuring and insolvency, corporate finance and consulting services. The alliance was established in 1989 and INPACT International together with sister alliances INPACT Americas and INPACT Asia Pacific, forms INPACT Global. Together the alliances comprise over 160 member firms in some 250 locations in more than 70 countries.

INPACT Global's legal status as an association is in accordance with the International Federation of Accountants (IFAC) audit code. INPACT Global is also ranked by the International Accounting Bulletin as the 18th largest association of accounting firms in the world. At the end of 2015, the aggregated revenues of all INPACT Global member firms totalled approximately USD268 million.

INPACT Global is one of 24 members of the European Group of International Accounting Networks & Associations (EGIAN) 

In March 2013, at the International Accounting Bulletin (IAB) Awards, the INPACT Global was selected as a Finalist in the "International Accounting Association of the Year" category.

In September 2014, at the International Accounting Bulletin (IAB) Awards, the INPACT Global won the Highly Commended award in the "International Accounting Association of the Year" category.

In October 2015, at the International Accounting Bulletin (IAB) Awards, the INPACT Global won the "Global Rising Star Association of the Year" award.

The Chair of INPACT Global's Board of Directors is Ralf Zeiss, who is a partner at uniTreu GmbH in Germany.

History 
1989: INPACT International was founded, with the name abbreviated from International Network of Professional Accountants.
1995: An agreement was signed with CPA Management Systems, Inc. to form the organization's North American sister alliance INPACT Americas. 
1998: A similar agreement was signed with APACT in Hong Kong to form the organization's Asia Pacific sister alliance INPACT Asia Pacific.

Presidents of INPACT's Europe, Middle East, Africa and Central South American region

Presidents of INPACT's North American region

External links
EGIAN
Accountancy Age
European Group of International Accounting Networks and Associations (EGIAN)
International Accounting Bulletin
IFAC

References 

Accounting firms of the United Kingdom
International professional associations